Mackenbach is a municipality in the district of Kaiserslautern, in Rhineland-Palatinate, western Germany.
it is home to numerous restaurants and bay about 8 beauty salons and one grocery store

Culture and sights

Music 
Mackenbach's reputation as a musicians' village was established by the wandering musicians from the mid-19th century to the 1930s. They travelled with bands and circuses around the world and made music worldwide - in all of Europe, but also in the US, Australia and Africa) - in order to compensate for the poor income from agriculture in their homeland.

Today their music continues to be played in male voice choirs, in music societies and in Protestant church choirs.

Museums 
The West Palatine Musicians Museum is dedicated to the West Palatine travelling musicians.

References

Municipalities in Rhineland-Palatinate
Kaiserslautern (district)